Diellza Krasniqi (born 10 September 1993), better known by her artistic name Dejzi, is a fashion designer from Kosovo.

Early life 
Diellza Krasniqi was born in Mitrovica, Kosovo. On her teenage years she started developing her passion for sewing and fashion while being influenced by her mother who was a dressmaker at the time. Diellza presented her collection ‘Galaxy’ in Harbin Fashion Week on January, 2018.
Diellza has worked with international celebrities, such as Nour Al Ghandour, Katja Glieson, Gizele Oliveira, Narin Ammara, and Tayna

Collections 
Diellza has presented her work throughout years through her various collections, such as:

Pralla, March 2016
Delphinium, November 2017
Galaxy, January 2018
Gradient, May 2018
By The Way, November 2018 
Éternité, December 2018
Bloom, April 2019
Énorme, October 2019.

References

External links
 

Living people
1993 births
People from Mitrovica, Kosovo
Fashion stylists
Kosovan women fashion designers
Kosovan fashion designers